MacManaway and McManaway are similar surnames. Notable people with these two names include:

 Hugh MacManaway (born 19th century), Dean of Clogher, Northern Ireland
 James MacManaway (bishop) (1860–1947), Irish Anglican bishop
 J. G. MacManaway (1898–1951), British Unionist politician and cleric 
 Milton McManaway (1901–1946), American college football player